Jacquetta May is a British writer, actress and theatre director. She co-founded the award-winning new-writing theatre company Plain Clothes Productions, commissioning, producing and directing for the company. She directed Her Sister Tongue at Lyric Theatre in Hammersmith, London, in 1997.

Early life
Born in Kent, May studied at Bristol University.

Career

Acting
May worked as a theatre actress for 10 years, appearing at the National Theatre, The Royal Exchange and Liverpool Playhouse amongst others. Theatre roles include Eliza Doolittle in Pygmalion, Adriana in The Comedy of Errors, Olivia in Twelfth Night, Lady Chatterley in Lady Chatterley's Lover, Rita in Educating Rita and Beverley in Abigail's Party.

Moving into television, in 1991 she joined EastEnders for two years and played Rachel Kominski, Michelle Fowler's landlady and Mark Fowler's girlfriend.  She went on to be a regular in Dangerfield (1996), Cardiac Arrest (1996), and Home Farm Twins (1999), and also appeared in Crocodile Shoes (1994), Peak Practice (2000), Down to Earth (2001), I'm Alan Partridge (2002), Silent Witness (2005), Law & Order: UK (2010), New Tricks (2011), Cold Feet (2001), Being Human (2010), The Bill (2006), Casualty (1996 - 2012) and Holby City (2003), Midsomer Murders (2021), as well as the film Get Real (1998).

Writing
May started writing for television at World Productions in 2000. She co-created UGetMe for CBBC which ran for 3 series (2003 - 2005), and wrote for  No Angels (2006),  Where the Heart Is (2000),  Shades (2000),  New Tricks (2006),  Personal Affairs (2009), and for the first series of  Torchwood (2006). Her film In Love with Barbara (2008)  about the romantic novelist Barbara Cartland and her friendship with Lord Mountbatten, starring Anne Reid and David Warner, was broadcast on BBC4 in 2008. She adapted Erica Jong's novel Fear of Flying. May's legal thriller Lawless, starring Suranne Jones, Lindsay Duncan and Jonathan Cake, was piloted in 2012 on Sky Living.

References

External links

Actresses from Kent
Alumni of the University of Bristol
English film actresses
English screenwriters
English soap opera actresses
English stage actresses
English television actresses
English theatre directors
British screenwriters
British television writers
British women dramatists and playwrights
Living people
Women science fiction and fantasy writers
British women television writers
Year of birth missing (living people)